The Canyon Dam in Texas is a rolled-earth dam on the Guadalupe River in the Hill Country. The water impounded by the dam forms Canyon Lake.

Geography

The dam is located near the Balcones Escarpment. The rocky canyons to the west of the escarpment can carry more water than the riverbeds of the plains to the east; this has caused problems with flash flooding in cities and towns east of the escarpment.

History
After major floods on the Guadalupe River in 1936 and 1938, state and community leaders pressured the federal government to help control flooding of the river.  Congress authorized initial funds for construction of a dam in the Rivers and Harbors Act of 1945; final construction approval came in the Flood Control Act of 1954.

Construction of Canyon Dam began in 1958 to provide both flood control and water conservation. Impoundment of the lake began in 1964, and the lake was filled to its conservation level in 1968. The dam was built by the Tencon Corporation of Fort Worth, Texas. The United States Army Corps of Engineers  controls the physical operations; and water in the lake is managed by the Guadalupe-Blanco River Authority.

External links
 Canyon Lake information from the U.S. Army Corps of Engineers
 Guadalupe-Blanco River Authority
 Canyon Lake information from http://www.edwardsaquifer.net/
 Canyon Lake levels and Canyon Dam release rates
 Canyon Lake Chamber of Commerce
 
 Map: 

Buildings and structures in Comal County, Texas
Dams in Texas
Guadalupe River (Texas)
United States Army Corps of Engineers dams
Dams completed in 1964